The Maine flood of 1987 was a pair of spring storms in March and April 1987, which combined with snow-melt, resulted in heavy flooding in Maine, New Hampshire and Massachusetts.

History

Preconditions 
In the days before the first storm, weather throughout New England was mostly clear and dry. Except in higher-elevation areas, much of southern New England's snow-pack from December and January had disappeared. 

However, snow-packs in Maine were just beginning to melt. A five to six-inch snow/water equivalent was not uncommon, with some measurements of ten inches recorded at the end of March.

A storm that had affected the midwest with heavy snow and winds spun off a slow moving low-pressure system that moved across New England. The southeasterly winds produced significant orographic lift in the mountains of Maine and New Hampshire, causing significant precipitation on the east side of these mountain ranges. The highest recorded rainfall accumulations were 8.30 inches at Pinkham Notch, New Hampshire and 7.3 inches at Blanchard, Maine.

Flood
The first storm mainly focused on Maine. The Kennebec River basin was most severely impacted with record flows on the mainstem and its primary tributaries—the Carrabassett River, Sandy River (Kennebec River), and Sebasticook River. The Piscataquis River experienced flows 50% greater than any measured before. 

Many other rivers in Maine—Penobscot, Saco and Androscoggin—also experienced significant flooding; however, flows were generally below records. Moderate flooding occurred within the Merrimack River and Connecticut River basins.

Results
Independent sources reported one and five deaths resulting from the flood.

Other damage included:

 2,100 homes flooded; 215 destroyed, 240 with major damage
 400 small businesses impacted
 Roads and bridges destroyed or damaged
 Fort Halifax (Maine) historic site in Winslow, Maine, washed away
 Losses estimated at over

References

1987 natural disasters in the United States
Floods in the United States
1987 in Maine
1987 floods in the United States
March 1987 events in the United States
April 1987 events in the United States
Natural disasters in Maine
Natural disasters in New Hampshire
Natural disasters in Massachusetts
1987 in Massachusetts